John H. Gilmour (1857–1922) was a Canadian stage and film actor. He was a member of the summer stock cast at Denver's Elitch Theatre in 1904 and 1906, including a performance of The Crisis, based on the book by Winston Churchill with Maude Fealy and a young Denver native named Douglas Fairbanks.

Selected filmography
 Sylvia of the Secret Service (1917)
 Over the Hill (1917)
 The Streets of Illusion (1917)
 Her Beloved Enemy (1917)
 The Last of the Carnabys (1917)
 The Mark of Cain (1917)
 A Crooked Romance (1917)
 The Candy Girl (1917)
 Waifs (1918)
 The Whirlpool (1918)
 The Naulahka (1918)

References

Bibliography 
 Langman, Larry. American Film Cycles: The Silent Era. Greenwood Publishing, 1998.

External links 
 
 

1857 births
1922 deaths
Canadian male stage actors
Canadian male film actors
Canadian emigrants to the United States